The Far West League was a minor league baseball league that operated from 1948 to 1951. The Far West League was a Class D level league, with franchises based in California, Nevada and Oregon. The Santa Rosa Pirates (1948), Pittsburg Diamonds (1949), Redding Browns (1950) and Klamath Falls Gems (1951) won league championships.

History
The Far West League had eight teams in each of its first three seasons, before reducing to six teams in its final season of 1951. The league began play in 1948 with the Klamath Falls Gems, Marysville Braves, Medford Nuggets, Oroville Red Sox, Pittsburg Diamonds, Redding Browns, Santa Rosa Pirates and Willows Cardinals as the charter members.

In 1948, the Klamath Falls Gems were a Philadelphia Phillies affiliate; the Marysville Braves a Boston Braves affiliate; the Medford Nuggets, a Brooklyn Dodgers affiliate; the Oroville Red Sox, a Boston Red Sox affiliate; the Redding Browns, a St. Louis Browns affiliate; the Santa Rosa Pirates, a Pittsburgh Pirates affiliate and the Willows Cardinals were a St. Louis Cardinals affiliate.

The league held four–team playoffs from 1948 to 1950 and a two–team final in 1951. League championships were won by the Santa Rosa Pirates (1948), Pittsburg Diamonds (1949), Redding Browns (1950), and Klamath Falls Gems (1951).

The Far West League permanently folded following the conclusion of the 1951 season.

Cities represented
Chico, CA - Chico Red Sox (1949)
Eugene, OR – Eugene Larks (1950–1951)
Klamath Falls, OR – Klamath Falls Gems (1948–1951)
Marysville, CA – Marysville Braves (1948–1949); Marysville Peaches (1950)
Medford, OR – Medford Nuggets (1948–1949); Medford Rogues (1950–1951)
Oroville, CA – Oroville Red Sox (1948)  
Pittsburg, CA – Pittsburg Diamonds (1948, 1949–1951)
Redding, CA – Redding Browns (1948–1951)
Reno, NV – Reno Silver Sox (1950–1951) 
Roseville, CA – Roseville Diamonds (1948)
Santa Rosa, CA – Santa Rosa Pirates (1948); Santa Rosa Cats (1949)
Vallejo, CA – Vallejo Chiefs (1949)
Willows, CA – Willows Cardinals (1948–1950)

Standings & statistics 
1948 Far West Leagueschedule
 Pittsburg (31–48) moved to Roseville July 30 Playoffs: Klamath Falls 3 games, Oroville 1; Santa Rosa 3 games, Medford 1 Finals: Santa Rosa 4 games, Klamath Falls 3.

1949 Far West League
 Vallejo disbanded July 31; Santa Rosa disbanded August 4.  Playoffs: Pittsburg 3 games, Willows 2; Redding 3 games, Klamath Falls 2  Finals: Pittsburg 4 games, Redding 3.

1950 Far West Leagueschedule
 Playoffs: Klamath Falls 3 games, Reno 2; Redding 3 games, Medford 0  Finals: Redding 3 games, Klamath Falls 1.

1951 Far West Leagueschedulerevised schedule after Pittsburg disbanded
Pittsburg disbanded June 14  Playoff Final: Klamath Falls 3 games, Redding 0

References

External links
Far West League Chart

Defunct minor baseball leagues in the United States
Baseball leagues in California
Baseball in Nevada
Baseball leagues in Oregon
Sports leagues established in 1948
Sports leagues disestablished in 1951